{{DISPLAYTITLE:C23H25O12}}
The molecular formula C23H25O12 (or C23H25O12+ or C23H25ClO12, molar mass: 493.43 g/mol (528.89 g/mol for chloride), exact mass: 493.13460119 (528.103454 (for chloride)) may refer to:
 Primulin (anthocyanin), an anthocyanin
 Oenin, an anthocyanin